The 19th New Brunswick Legislative Assembly represented New Brunswick between February 12, 1862, and February 8, 1865.

The assembly sat at the pleasure of the Governor of New Brunswick Arthur Charles Hamilton-Gordon.

The speaker of choice was John M. Johnson. After Johnson was appointed Attorney General in 1863, John C. Allen was named Speaker.

History

Members

Notes:

References
Journal of the House of Assembly of ... New Brunswick from ... February to ... April, 1862 ... (1862)

Terms of the New Brunswick Legislature
1862 in Canada
1863 in Canada
1864 in Canada
1865 in Canada
1862 establishments in New Brunswick
1865 disestablishments in New Brunswick